AAES may refer to:

 American Association of Endocrine Surgeons, a professional organization
 American Association of Engineering Societies, an umbrella organization of engineering societies
 Ansett Aviation Engineering Services, see 
 Arkansas Agricultural Experiment Station, the research component of the University of Arkansas System's Division of Agriculture
 Australian Army Education Service, see Royal Australian Army Educational Corps
 Anti-Aircraft Experimental Section, part of the British Ministry of Munitions
 Erik Aaes (1899–1966), Danish set designer and art director